The Indonesian Army has formed a large number of infantry battalions since it was formed from provisional militias during the Indonesian National Revolution against the Dutch colonial rule, 1945–1949. Today, the International Institute for Strategic Studies' Military Balance 2007 lists the Army with 2 brigades (6 battalions) plus 60 other battalions in the KODAMs, or Military Regional Commands, and nine battalions in KOSTRAD, the Army Strategic Reserve Command. There are also around nine airborne battalions.

Indonesian military units are commonly referred to by compound words. Infantry battalions are routinely called as Yonifs which is a portmanteau from "batalyon infanteri" ('infantry battalion'). They are also commonly referred to by their battalion nicknames, for example: 511th Infantry Battalion - "Dibyatama Yudha".

Organization
The Infantry Branch is the principal and major unit of the Indonesian army combat element. The Infantry element is the largest and main combat troops within the Indonesian army. Kostrad and Kopassus are all part of this branch although it also consists of non-infantry units internally. In Indonesia, there are more than 100 Infantry Battalions spread throughout the country. Green berets are worn by Indonesian Army infantrymen. The Infantry Branch of the Indonesian Army are under the auspices of the Infantry Branch Centre ("Pussenif") which is under the command of a Lieutenant general. The Infantry branch of the Indonesian Army consists of huge numbers of units whereas the International Institute for Strategic Studies' Military Balance 2007 lists the Army with 2 brigades, (6 battalions), plus 60 other battalions in each Military districts ("Kodam") and nine battalions in Kostrad.

The elite infantry battalions of the Indonesian Army are called "Raider Battalions" (raised on 2003) which are specially trained in Raid and Air assault operations (including counter-terrorism, Extraction, Guerrilla and Close combat operations). By strength and capabilities, 1 battalion of Raider infantry is equal to 3 regular infantry battalions combined. There are currently about 49 raider battalions in the Indonesian Army Infantry branch, with the strength of 650 to 800 men per-battalion. It is larger compared to regular infantry battalions which only consists about 450 to 570 infantrymen. Even as the Chief of Staff of the Army (Kasad) is planning in the future to qualify all Infantry battalions (except mechanized) as "Raider"-ready, there are now mechanized battalions which are "Raider"-qualified in addition to their mechanized role. Infantry battalions in the Indonesian Army originates from different combat organisations or corps, there are several infantry battalions part of Kostrad and some are part of the territorial military commands (Kodams), the same case also falls to Raider Infantry battalions. Currently, there are now 3 Airborne infantry brigades in the Indonesian Army which are all "Raider" qualified (called as: Para-raider), and are all part of the Kostrad. The Infantry beret colors of the Indonesian army are as shown below:
Regular Infantry soldiers wear: Light Green Beret with crossed-rifle insignia 
Kostrad infantrymen wear: Dark Green Beret with Kostrad emblem, (Airborne units are added a paratrooper wing insignia on the beret)
Raider infantrymen wear: Dark Green beret with bayonet emblem
Mechanized Infantrymen wear: Dark Green beret with Mechanized Infantry emblem
There are today 5 types of Infantry battalions in the Indonesian Army, which are:
 Parachute-Raider Infantry Battalion (abbreviated "Yonif Para Raider"): are Airborne infantry battalions part of Kostrad which are able in Air assault and Raid operations.
 Mechanized-Raider Infantry Battalion (abbreviated "Yonif Mekanis Raider"): are Raider infantry battalions which are Mechanized that are special operations-capaable which also can carry out urban warfare and ground mechanized-infantry operations.
 Raider Infantry Battalion (abbreviated "Yonif Raider"): are infantry battalions which are basically trained for Raid warfare and Air assault operations. 
 Mechanized Infantry Battalion (abbreviated "Yonif Mekanis"): are mobilized infantry battalions, equipped with APCs and IFVs.
 Infantry Battalion (abbreviated "Yonif"): are light Infantry battalions.

All infantrymen of the Indonesian National Armed Forces (TNI), the Army included, have capabilities in Jungle warfare.

Para-Raider infantry battalions

Raider infantry battalions

In the Indonesian Army, the Raider Infantry (In Indonesia known as Yonif Raider) is a type of specialized-infantry above of regular infantry which are trained to conduct Raids, military extraction (hostage rescue), counter-terrorist, airborne, Guerrilla and Air assault operations. It also is trained to conduct urban and jungle warfare. The first ten battalions of the raider infantry which were inaugurated on December 22, 2003, were formed by transforming 8 battalions of territorial commands and 2 Kostrad battalions. As a counterweight force, the strength of a Raider Infantry Battalion (Yonif Raider) is equivalent to three times the strength of an ordinary/regular infantry battalion (Yonif) in the Army. This infantry unit is back grounded with "Raid" battle tactics known as "Depredation".

Each Raider battalion consists of approximately 810 personnel of all ranks, larger than the normal battalions of around 570 infantrymen. These personnel were given special education and training for six months for modern warfare, guerrilla and anti-guerrilla warfare, and protracted warfare tactics and strategies. Each of these battalions is trained to have triple combat capabilities of ordinary infantry battalions (Yonifs). Raider infantrymen are trained to perform ambushes, airborne and air assault operations, such as foray from helicopters and transport aircraft, while Raider infantrymen in the mechanized battalions are also trained in mechanized and urban warfare operations. 50 personnel each in a Raider battalion are Counter-terrorism qualified with other additional specialized skills. The Kopassus Special Forces Education and Training Center ("Pusdikpassus") located in Batujajar, West Java is where Raider infantrymen get their advance special operations training before being stationed to their respective Raider battalions. Aside from the Raider battalions, the Indonesian Army also fosters "Para-Raider" battalions which are Raider infantry units qualified as Airborne which all are within the Kostrad corps. There are also Raider infantry battalions which are Mechanised (Mekanis Raider) in the Army, the units are the 411th, 412th, and 413th Mechanized-Raider Infantry Battalions which are part of the 6th Infantry Brigade, 2nd Kostrad Infantry Division and the 113th Raider Infantry Battalion (Mechanized) from the 25th Infantry Brigade, Kodam Iskandar Muda.

Other infantry battalions

Regular infantry battalions
Regular infantry battalions below are categorized as Light infantry battalions, which some are "Raider" qualified. They are addressed as "Yonif" (abbreviated from Batalyon Infanteri) in Indonesia, for example Yonif 125 means: 125th Infantry Battalion. The lists are as shown below:
 116th Infantry Battalion 
 121st Infantry Battalion 
 122nd Infantry Battalion 
 123rd Infantry Battalion 
 125th Infantry Battalion 
 126th Infantry Battalion 
 131st Infantry Battalion 
 132nd Infantry Battalion 
 133rd Infantry Battalion 
 141st Infantry Battalion 
 143rd Infantry Battalion 
 144th Infantry Battalion  
 310th Infantry Battalion 
 312th Infantry Battalion 
 315th Infantry Battalion 
 403rd Infantry Battalion 
 405th Infantry Battalion 
 406th Infantry Battalion 
 407th Infantry Battalion 
 410th Infantry Battalion  
 511th Infantry Battalion  
 527th Infantry Battalion 
 611th Infantry Battalion 
 623rd Infantry Battalion 
 642nd Infantry Battalion 
 644th Infantry Battalion
 645th Infantry Battalion  
 711th Infantry Battalion 
 713th Infantry Battalion 
 714th Infantry Battalion
 721st Infantry Battalion 
 725th Infantry Battalion 
 726th Infantry Battalion 
 731st Infantry Battalion 
 732nd Infantry Battalion 
 734th Infantry Battalion 
 742nd Infantry Battalion 
 743rd Infantry Battalion 
 757th Infantry Battalion
 761st Infantry battalion
 764th Infantry Battalion

Mechanized infantry battalions (including Raider battalions) 
 Part of the 1st Capital City Defense Mechanized Infantry Brigade, Kodam Jaya  (Brigade Infanteri 1 Pengaman Ibu Kota/"Jaya Sakti") 
 201st Mechanized Infantry Battalion 
 202nd Mechanized Infantry Battalion 
 203rd Mechanized Infantry Battalion 
 Part of the 6th Mechanized Raider Infantry Brigade, Kostrad (Brigade Infanteri Mekanis 6/"Trisakti Baladaya")
 411th Mechanized Infantry Battalion (Raider qualified) 
 412th Mechanized Infantry Battalion (Raider qualified)
 413th Mechanized Infantry Battalion (Raider qualified) 
 Part of the 14th Mechanized Infantry Brigade, Kostrad (Brigade Infanteri Mekanis 14/"Mandala Yudha")
 318th Mechanized Infantry Battalion
 320th Mechanized Infantry Battalion 
 Part of the 16th Mechanized Infantry Brigade, Kodam V/Brawijaya (Brigade Infanteri 16/"Wira Yudha")
 512th Mechanized Infantry Battalion 
 516th Mechanized Infantry Battalion 
 521st Mechanized Infantry Battalion 
 Part of Kodam XII/Tanjungpura military district command 
 643rd Mechanized Infantry Battalion.
 Part of Kodam IX/Udayana military district command
 741st Mechanized Infantry Battalion
 Part of Kodam IV/Diponegoro military district command
 403rd Mechanized Infantry Battalion 
 Part of 091/Aji Surya Natakusuma Military Area command
 611th Mechanized Infantry Battalion 
 Part of 25th Infantry Brigade, Kodam Iskandar Muda
113th Mechanized Infantry Battalion (Raider qualified)

See also
 1st Kostrad Infantry Division
 2nd Kostrad Infantry Division
 3rd Kostrad Infantry Division

Notes

Further reading
Ken Conboy, Kopassus: Inside Indonesia's Special Forces, Equinox Publishing, Jakarta/Singapore, 2003 - mentions many Indonesian battalions in his history of the special forces from the 1950s to the present.
Kostrad order of battle 1999, listing infantry battalions among other units
Douglas Kammem, Notes on the Transformation of the East Timor Military Command and its Implications for Indonesia, Indonesia 67, April 1999

Infantry battalions
Indonesian Army
Battalions of Indonesia
Infantry battalions